Luis Darío Calvo (born 10 October 1977) is a retired Argentine football player.

Calvo began his playing career with Boca Juniors and appeared in 19 Primera Division Argentina matches for the club, including his debut on 16 December 1995. Next, he joined Rosario Central where he would appear in another seven Primera matches. Calvo went on to play in the Primera B for Banfield and Independiente Rivadavia. He also had spells with AEK Athens and Kalamata in the Greek Alpha Ethniki.

References

1977 births
Living people
Argentine footballers
Boca Juniors footballers
Rosario Central footballers
Club Atlético Banfield footballers
Independiente Rivadavia footballers
S.S. Virtus Lanciano 1924 players
AEK Athens F.C. players
Kalamata F.C. players
Panachaiki F.C. players
C.D. Jorge Wilstermann players
Argentine Primera División players
Argentine expatriate footballers
Expatriate footballers in Greece
Sportspeople from Buenos Aires Province
Association football forwards